Glyphaea is a genus of African flowering plants in the family Malvaceae, subfamily Grewioideae; it was previously placed in the Tiliaceae or Sparrmanniaceae.

It contains the following species:
 Glyphaea brevis
 Glyphaea tomentosa

References

Grewioideae
Malvaceae genera
Taxonomy articles created by Polbot
Taxa named by Joseph Dalton Hooker